The green-backed whistler (Pachycephala albiventris) or olive-backed whistler, is a species of bird in the family Pachycephalidae. It is endemic to the Philippines.

Its natural habitats are tropical moist lowland forest and tropical moist montane forest.

Taxonomy and systematics
Formerly, some authorities considered the green-backed whistler to be a subspecies of the mangrove whistler.

Subspecies
Three subspecies are recognized:
 P. a. albiventris – (Ogilvie-Grant, 1894): Found on northern Luzon (Philippines)
 P. a. crissalis – (Zimmer, JT, 1918): Originally described as a separate species. Found on central and southern Luzon (Philippines)
 P. a. mindorensis – (Bourns & Worcester, 1894): Originally described as a separate species. Found on Mindoro (Philippines)

References

green-backed whistler
Endemic birds of the Philippines
Birds of Luzon
Birds of Mindoro
Taxa named by William Robert Ogilvie-Grant
green-backed whistler
Taxonomy articles created by Polbot